Austin J. Rhodes (25 February 1937 – 12 February 2019) was an English World Cup winning professional rugby league footballer who played in the 1950s and 1960s, and coached in the 1970s.

Background
Austin Rhodes' birth was registered in St Helens, Lancashire, England, and he was a pupil at St Austin's School in Thatto Heath.

Playing career

International honours
Austin Rhodes won caps for Great Britain while at St Helens in the 1957 Rugby League World Cup against New Zealand, in the 1960 Rugby League World Cup against France (2-tries) and Australia (2-goals), and in 1961 against New Zealand.

Championship final appearances
Austin Rhodes played , and scored 10-goals in St. Helens' 44-22 victory over Hunslet in the Championship Final during the 1958–59 season at Odsal Stadium, Bradford on Saturday 16 May 1959.

County league appearances
Austin Rhodes played in St. Helens' victory in the Lancashire County League during the 1959–60 season and 1968–69 season.

Challenge Cup Final appearances
Austin Rhodes played , and scored 2-goals in St. Helens 13-2 victory over Halifax in the 1955–56 Challenge Cup Final during the 1955–56 season at Wembley Stadium, London on Saturday 28 April 1956, in front of a crowd of 79,341, and played , and scored 3-goals and 2-drop goals in the 12-6 victory over Wigan in the 1960–61 Challenge Cup Final during the 1960–61 season at Wembley Stadium, London on Saturday 13 May 1961, in front of a crowd of 94,672.

County Cup Final appearances
Austin Rhodes played  in St. Helens' 3-10 defeat by Oldham in the 1956–57 Lancashire County Cup Final during the 1956–57 season at Central Park, Wigan on Saturday 20 October 1956, played , and scored 2-goals in the 4-5 defeat by Warrington in the 1959–60 Lancashire County Cup Final during the 1959–60 season at Central Park, Wigan on Saturday 31 October 1959, played , and scored 1-try, and 3-goals in the 15-9 victory over Swinton in the 1960–61 Lancashire County Cup Final during the 1960–61 season at Central Park, Wigan on Saturday 29 October 1960, played , and scored 1-try, and 5-goals in the 25-9 victory over Swinton in the 1961–62 Lancashire County Cup Final during the 1961–62 season at Central Park, Wigan on Saturday 11 November 1961, played  in Leigh's 4-15 defeat by St. Helens in the 1963–64 Lancashire County Cup Final during the 1963–64 season at Knowsley Road, St. Helens on Saturday 26 October 1963, and played  in St. Helens' 30-2 victory over Oldham in the 1968–69 Lancashire County Cup Final during the 1968–69 season at Central Park, Wigan on Friday 25 October 1968.

Tour matches
Austin Rhodes played , and scored 1-try, and 7-goals in St. Helens 44-2 victory over Australia in the 1956-57 Kangaroo tour of Great Britain and France during the 1956–57 season at Knowsley Road, St. Helens on Saturday 24 November 1956, played , and scored 1-goals in St. Helens 2-15 defeat by Australia in the 1959-60 Kangaroo tour of Great Britain and France during the 1959–60 season at Knowsley Road, St. Helens on Saturday 10 October 1959.

Genealogical information
Austin Rhodes' marriage to Marlene L. (née May) was registered during third ¼ 1963 in St. Helens district. They had children; Martyn J. Rhodes (birth registered during first ¼  in Prescot district), and Karen L. Rhodes (birth registered during fourth ¼  in Widnes district).

Rhodes died on 12 February 2019, aged 81.

References

External links
!Great Britain Statistics at englandrl.co.uk (statistics currently missing due to not having appeared for both Great Britain, and England)
(archived by web.archive.org) Saints slaughter Kangaroos

1937 births
2019 deaths
English rugby league coaches
English rugby league players
Great Britain national rugby league team players
Lancashire rugby league team players
Leigh Leopards players
Pilkington Recs coaches
Rugby league centres
Rugby league five-eighths
Rugby league fullbacks
Rugby league halfbacks
Rugby league players from St Helens, Merseyside
St Helens R.F.C. players
Swinton Lions coaches
Swinton Lions players